Flame of the Desert is a 1919 American silent drama film starring Geraldine Farrar and Lou Tellegen. It was directed by Reginald Barker and produced by Samuel Goldwyn.

Plot

Cast
Geraldine Farrar as Lady Isabelle Channing
Lou Tellegen as Sheik Essad
Alec B. Francis as Sir John Carleton
Edythe Chapman as Lady Snowden
Casson Ferguson as Sir Charles Channing
Macey Harlam as Aboul Bey
Syn De Conde as Abdullah
Milton Ross as Sheik
Miles Dobson as Sheik Imbrim
Jim Mason as Desert Sheik
Louis Durham as Desert Sheik
Eli Stanton as Ullah (credited as Ely Stanton)
Jack Carlyle (unidentified role)  (credited as J. Montgomery Carlyle)

Preservation status
Prints of the film exist at the Library of Congress and Cineteca Nazionale in Rome.

References

External links

1919 films
American silent feature films
Films directed by Reginald Barker
Goldwyn Pictures films
1919 drama films
Silent American drama films
American black-and-white films
1910s American films
Films with screenplays by Richard Schayer